Chiromachla transitella is a moth of the  family Erebidae. It is found in Tanzania.

References

Endemic fauna of Tanzania
Nyctemerina
Moths described in 1909